The Christian Cemetery at Narayanguda is one of the largest cemeteries located at Hyderabad, Andhra Pradesh, India.

The cemetery is divided into two sections, namely Roman Catholic and Protestant, to accommodate people of the two different Christian denominations. More recently the older graves are being replaced by new ones due to lack of space for the newly dead, as even the government had refused to donate new land despite repeated requests. The cemetery pays its electricity bills in the name of Prophet Isaiah.

Notable burials
 Bakht Singh (1903–2000), Christian evangelist
 A. B. Masilamani (1914–1990), Baptist pastor and evangelist

References

External links

 
 St George's Church, Hyderabad
 Reach Out Hyderabad
 Brother Bakht Singh

Cemeteries in India
Christian cemeteries
Buildings and structures in Hyderabad, India
Year of establishment missing